Henry Hoyt may refer to:
Henry Hoyt (bookseller), 19th century publisher and bookseller in Boston, Massachusetts, USA
 Henry M. Hoyt (1830–1892), 18th governor of Pennsylvania, USA
 Henry M. Hoyt (Solicitor General) (1856–1910), solicitor general of the US and son of the above
 Henry Hamilton Hoyt Sr. (1895–1990), president of Carter products division of Carter-Wallace
 Henry Harrison Hoyt (1840–?), Wisconsin state assemblyman